Melaleuca adnata, commonly known as sandhill honey-myrtle, is a plant in the myrtle family, Myrtaceae and is endemic to the south-west of Western Australia. It is a tall shrub with papery bark and spikes of white flowers in spring and early summer.

Description
Its leaves are arranged in alternating pairs at right angles to the pairs above and below so that there are four rows of leaves along the stems. The petioles are attached the underside of the leaves (peltate).

The flowers are white to cream coloured and arranged in spikes on the sides of the branches. The stamens are arranged in five bundles around the flowers and there are 10 to 16 stamens in a bundle.

Taxonomy and naming
Melaleuca adnata was first described in 1852 by Nikolai Turczaninow in Bulletin de la Classe Physico-Mathématique de l'Académie Impériale des Sciences de Saint-Pétersbourg. The specific epithet (adnata) is derived from the Latin adnatus, meaning "adnate", referring to the attachment of the leaves to the stem.

Distribution and habitat
Melaleuca adnata occurs in and between the Kalbarri, Ongerup and Mount Holland districts in the Avon Wheatbelt, Coolgardie, Esperance Plains, Geraldton Sandplains and Mallee biogeographic regions.  It grows in sandy or clayey soils, sometimes over laterite, along drainage lines and flats.

Conservation status
This species is classified as "not threatened" by the Government of Western Australia Department of Parks and Wildlife.

References

adnata
Myrtales of Australia
Plants described in 1852
Endemic flora of Western Australia
Taxa named by Nikolai Turczaninow